The PATSY Award was originated by the Hollywood office of the American Humane Association in 1939. They decided to honor animal performers after a horse was killed in an on-set accident during the filming of the Tyrone Power film Jesse James. The letters are an acronym, and stand for Picture Animal Top Star of the Year. A later acronym was also included: Performing Animal Television Star of the Year.

The very first recipient of a PATSY was Francis the Talking Mule in 1951, in a ceremony hosted by Ronald Reagan at Hollywood's Carthay Circle Theater. The award later covered both film and television and was separated into four categories: canine, equine, wild and special. The special category encompassed everything from goats to cats to pigs – Arnold Ziffel of TV's Green Acres was a two-time winner. Arnold's trainer, Frank Inn, was the proud owner of over 40 PATSY awards, thanks to his work with Orangey, the cat from Rhubarb (1951) and Breakfast at Tiffany's (1961); Higgins, the dog (who played the lead in the Benji movies and "Dog" on Petticoat Junction); Cleo the Basset Hound; and Lassie, and Tramp the dog from My Three Sons to name a few. Lassie was retired to the PATSY Hall of Fame after receiving many awards over the years.

The Craven Award was named in honor of Richard C. Craven, the first director of the Hollywood AHA. It recognized animals that would normally have had no opportunity to appear in a starring role. The TV and Movie Animal Walk of Fame was established in front of the Burbank Animal Shelter, honoring certain early recipients of the PATSY Awards.

By the 1970s, the awards were being presented in a televised ceremony, with animal recipients selected by the general public who voted in ballots which appeared in Associated Press newspapers. The first network presentation was on CBS in 1973.

Over the years the PATSY Award ceremony was hosted by various celebrities, including Betty White, Allen Ludden, and Bob Barker. Barker has stated he eventually resigned in protest of the cruel methods some trainers use when training animals for films.

The awards ended in 1986 due to lack of funding. That year the Genesis Awards were established to honor individuals in the major news and entertainment media for producing outstanding works which raise public awareness of animal issues. In 2011 the American Humane Society announced the creation of the Pawscars, described as, "an unofficial, animal-centric spin on the Oscars."

The American Humane Association is the organization responsible for the disclaimer at the end of many films and television programs that "No Animals Were Harmed" in the production.

PATSY Award Winners (partial listing) 
Source, 1951–1973:

1951
Motion Pictures
 Francis the Talking Mule (Francis)
 California the horse (The Palamino)
 Pierre the chimp (My Friend Irma Goes West)
Award of Excellence
 Flame the dog (My Pal)
 Lassie the dog (Challenge to Lassie)
 Black Diamond the horse (Black Midnight)
 Jackie the Lion (Samson and Delilah)
Craven Award
 Jerry Brown the horse – trained by Ace Hudkins

1952
Motion Pictures
 Rhubarb the cat (Rhubarb)
 Francis the mule (Francis Goes to the Races)
Award of Excellence
 Chinook the dog (Yukon Manhunt)
 Diamond the horse (Flame of Araby)
 Corky the dog (Behave Yourself)
Craven Award
 Smoky the horse – owned/trained by Fat Jones

1953
Motion Pictures
 Jackie the lion (Fearless Fagen)
 Bonzo the Chimp (Bonzo Goes to College)
 Trigger the horse (Son of Paleface)
Award of Excellence
 Francis the mule (Francis Goes to West Point)
 Tramp Jr. the dog (Room for One More)
 Cheeta the chimp (Tarzan's Savage Fury)
 Chinook the dog (Yukon Gold)
Craven Award
 Bracket the horse – owned by Hudkins Stables

1954
Motion Pictures
 Sam the dog (Hondo)
 Francis the mule (Francis Covers the Big Town)
 Jackie the lion (Androcles and the Lion)
Award of Excellence
 Baron the dog (Back to God's Country)
 Peggy the chimp (Valley of the Headhunters)
 Jackie the lion (White Witch Doctor)
Craven Award
 Cocaine the horse – owned/trained by Chuck Roberson

1955
Motion Pictures
 Beauty the horse (Gypsy Colt)
 Francis the mule (Francis Joins the WACS)
 Esmerelda the seal (20,000 Leagues Under the Sea)
Award of Excellence
 Shep the dog (A Bullet is Waiting)
 Satin the tiger (Demetrius and the Gladiators)
 Beauty the horse (Outlaw Stallion)
Craven Award
 Flash the horse – owned/trained by Henry Willis

1956
Motion Pictures
 Wildfire the dog (It's a Dog's Life)
 Francis the mule (Francis in the Navy)
 Faro the dog (The Kentuckian)
Award of Excellence
N/A
Craven Award
 Flame the dog – owned/trained by Frank Barnes

1957
Motion Pictures
 Samantha the goose (Friendly Persuasion)
 Beauty the Horse (Giant)
 Francis the mule (Francis in the Haunted House)
Award of Excellence
 Silver the horse (The Lone Ranger)
 Lady the dog (Goodbye, My Lady)
 Bascom the dog (Hollywood or Bust)
Craven Award
King Cotton the horse – owned/trained by Ralph McCutcheon

1958
(Starting in 1958 PATSY awards were also awarded to television animals)

Motion Pictures
 Spike the dog (Old Yeller)
 Beauty the horse (Wild Is the Wind)
 Kelly the dog (Kelly and Me)
Television
 Lassie the dog (Lassie)
 Cleo the dog (The People's Choice)
 Rin Tin Tin the dog (The Adventures of Rin Tin Tin)
Award of Excellence
 Tony the horse (Hoofs and Goofs / Movies)
 Flicka the horse (My Friend Flicka / TV)
Craven Award
 Trigger the horse – owned by Roy Rogers / trained by Glenn Randall

1959
Motion Pictures
 Pyewacket the cat (Bell, Book and Candle)
 Tonka the horse (Tonka)
 Henry the rabbit (The Geisha Boy)
Television
 Lassie the dog (Lassie)
 Asta the dog (The Thin Man)
 Rin Tin Tin the dog (The Adventures of Rin Tin Tin)
Award of Excellence
 King the dog (The Proud Rebel / Movies)
 Jasper the dog (Bachelor Father / TV)
Craven Award
 Baldy the horse – owned by Fat Jones Stables / trained by William "Buster" Trow

1960
Motion Pictures
 Shaggy the dog (The Shaggy Dog)
 Herman the pigeon (The Gazebo)
 North Wind the horse (The Sad Horse)
Television
 Asta the dog (The Thin Man)
 Lassie the dog (Lassie)
 Fury the horse (Fury); Jasper the dog (Bachelor Father) - tied
Craven Award
 Sharkey, Dempsey, Choctaw, and Joker the horses

1961
Motion Pictures
 King Cotton the horse (Pepe)
 Spike the dog (A Dog of Flanders)
 Stubbs the monkey (Toby Tyler); Skip the dog (Visit to a Small Planet) - tied
Television
 Tramp the dog (My Three Sons)
 Lassie the dog (Lassie)
 Fury the horse (Fury)

1962
Motion Pictures
 Orangey the cat (Breakfast at Tiffany's)
 Pete the dog (The Silent Call)
 Flame the horse (The Clown and the Kid)
Television
 Mister Ed the horse (Mister Ed)
 Lassie the dog (Lassie)
 Tramp the dog (My Three Sons)

1963
Motion Pictures
 Big Red the dog (Big Red)
 Sydney the elephant (Billy Rose's Jumbo)
 Zamba the lion (The Lion)
Television
 Mister Ed the horse (Mister Ed)
 Lassie the dog (Lassie)
 Tramp the dog (My Three Sons)
Craven Award
 Mickey O'Boyle the horse

1964
Motion Pictures
 Tom Dooley the dog (Savage Sam)
 Pluto the dog (My Six Loves)
 Raunchy the jaguar (Rampage)
Television
 Lassie the dog (Lassie)
 Mister Ed the horse (Mister Ed)
 Tramp the dog (My Three Sons)

1965
Motion Pictures
 Patrina the tiger (A Tiger Walks)
 Storm the dog (Goodbye Charlie)
 Junior the dog (Island of the Blue Dolphins)
Television
Flipper the dolphin (Flipper)
 Lassie the dog (Lassie)
 Mister Ed the horse (Mister Ed)
Craven Award
 Lucky Buck the horse

1966
Motion Pictures
 Syn Cat the cat (That Darn Cat!)
 Clarence the lion (Clarence, the Cross-Eyed Lion)
 Judy the chimp (Clarence, the Cross-Eyed Lion)
Television
 Flipper the dolphin (Flipper)
 Lord Nelson the dog (Please Don't Eat the Daisies)
 Higgins the dog (Petticoat Junction)
Craven Award
 Smokey the horse

1967
Motion Pictures
 Elsa the lion (Born Free)
 Duke the dog
 Vindicator the steer (The Rare Breed)
Television
 Judy the chimp (Daktari)
 Flipper the dolphin (Flipper)
 Arnold the pig (Green Acres)

1968
Motion Pictures
 Ben the bear (Gentle Giant)
 Sir Tim the mountain lion
 Sophie the sea lion (Dr. Dolittle)
Television
 Arnold the pig (Green Acres)
 Ben the bear (Gentle Ben)
 Clarence the lion (Daktari)

1969
Motion Pictures
 Albarado the horse (The Horse in the Gray Flannel Suit)
Television
 Arnold the pig (Green Acres, continuing role)
 Timmy the chimp (single appearance)
 Chauncey the cougar (commercial)

1970
Motion Pictures
 Rascal the raccoon (Rascal)
Television
 Scruffy the dog (The Ghost & Mrs. Muir, continuing role)
 Algae the seal (single appearance)
Craven Award
 Kilroy the horse

1971
Motion Pictures
 Ben the rat (Willard)
Television
 Arnold the pig (Green Acres, continuing role)
 Margie the elephant, Lassie's family three pups (tie)
 Pax the dog (Longstreet)
 Otto the horse (Lassie, single appearance)

1972
Motion Pictures
 Ben the rat (Ben)
Television
 Farouk the dog (Ironside, single appearance)
 Morris the Cat (special award, commercials)
Craven Award
 Cocaine the horse

1973
Motion Pictures)
 Alpha the Dolphin (The Day of the Dolphin)
Television
 Midnight the Cat ("Mannix and Barnaby Jones (TV series) (CBS Mystery Theater), Opening Trailer)")
Television Movie
 Caesar the Dog (Trapped)

Television Commercials (new category)

Scruffy the Dog (Chuck Wagon (dog food) commercials)
Sharon (Lewis) Evans AHA PATSY Award winner 1st Place with "Midnight" the Cat for best animal performance in a TV Series. American 
Humane Association "The National Review", June 1974 issue.

1974
Motion Pictures
 Tonto (Harry and Tonto)

1976
Motion Pictures
 Rosco the Mule (The Apple Dumpling Gang)

Trophy listing
The February 1, 1999, episodes of Antiques Roadshow features the 1967 American Humane Association Trophy for Outstanding Achievement in Motion Pictures, appraised by Leila Dunbar. On the trophy's base is a series of plaques listing the top winner in this category, matched with the year of the animal's movie work rather than the year the award was bestowed. The plaques list:

References

External links
American Humane Association
Stunt Horses
Advertising Awards: The PATSY Award
The 2011 Pawscars

American film awards
Awards to animals